James Joseph Walsh (20 February 1880 – 30 November 1948), generally referred to as J. J. Walsh, was Postmaster General, (later Minister for Posts and Telegraphs) of the Irish Free State from 1923 to 1927. He was also a senior Gaelic Athletic Association organiser and Cumann na nGaedheal politician. Later, Walsh had heavy connections with fascism, including his association with Ailtirí na hAiséirghe.

Early years
J. J. Walsh was born in the townland of Rathroon, near Bandon, County Cork. His family came from a farming background, "working a substantial holding of medium but well-cultivated land". Until the age of fifteen, Walsh attended a local school in Bandon, but by his own account "as far as learning went, I may as well have been at home". Together with his school-friend P. S. O'Hegarty, he passed the Civil Service exams for the Postal service. He later worked locally as a clerk in the Post Office. Like O'Hegarty, he spent three years in London at King's College, studying for the Secretary's Office "a syllabus (which) differed little from the Indian Civil Service". While O'Hegarty succeeded in his studies, Walsh did not, and returned to Cork where a friend, Sir Edward Fitzgerald, arranged work for him on the Entertainments Committee of the Cork International Exhibition.

Sport
Walsh was active in the Gaelic Athletic Association, promoting Gaelic games in many areas, but particularly in Cork city and county. His interest in organised sports had a strong political dimension. I happened to be one of those who realised the potentialities of the G.A.A. as a training ground for Physical Force. Contamination with the alien and all his works was taboo. I gathered around me a force of youthful enthusiasts from the University, Civil Service and Business. With this intensely organised instrument, war was declared on foreign games which were made to feel the shock so heavily that one by one, Soccer and Rugby Clubs began to disappear.He was also instrumental in establishing the 'revived' Tailteann Games.

He was Chairman of the Cork County Council GAA.

Politics
He was involved of the founding of the Cork City Irish Volunteers.

He participated in the Easter Rising in 1916 in the GPO. He claims he was responsible for mobilising 20 members of the Hibernian Rifles and took them to the GPO. However Rifles commandant John J. Scollan contradicts this account. He was promoted from Rifleman to Vice-Commandant of the Hibernian Rifles in 1915.

He was arrested following the general surrender and sentenced to death after a court-martial at Richmond Barracks. This was almost immediately commuted to life imprisonment, but he was released the following year under a general amnesty.

In autumn 1919 he was involved in a failed assassination attempt on Lord French.

Walsh was elected as a Sinn Féin Member of Parliament (MP) in the 1918 general election for the Cork City constituency. As a member of the 1st Dáil he was arrested for partaking in an illegal government.  He was released in 1921 and supported the Anglo-Irish Treaty and went on to become a founding member of the new political party, Cumann na nGaedheal. Walsh served as Postmaster General from 1922 until 1924 and joined the cabinet of W. T. Cosgrave between 1924 and 1927, after the office was reconstituted as the Department of Posts and Telegraphs.  He was elected at every election for the Cork Borough constituency until 1927 when he retired from government.

In August 1922 he was part of a government committee which was intended to consider what the "Irish free state"'s policy towards North-east Ulster would be.

During World War II, known at the time in Ireland as "the Emergency", Walsh's connections with fascism, including his association with Ailtirí na hAiséirghe, brought him to the attention of the Directorate of Intelligence (G2), the Intelligence branch of the Irish Army.  Their request to the Minister for Justice, Gerald Boland, to place a tap on Walsh's phone was, however, refused. He was closely associated with Irish-based pro-Nazi initiatives through his association with  Ailtirí na hAiséirghe, during World War II, frequently expressing his views with anti-semitic rhetoric. 

On Sunday 24 April 2016 a plaque commemorating J.J. Walsh was unveiled in Kilbrittain.

Bibliography
Walsh, J.J. : Recollections of a Rebel : The Kerryman Ltd., Tralee : 1944
O'Mahony, S : Frongoch – University of Revolution: FDR Teoranta, Dublin : 1987
O'Halpin, Eunan Defending Ireland: The Irish State and Its Enemies Since 1922 : 2000 :

References

External links
 The Cork International Exhibition 1902
 The Aonac Tailteann and the Tailteann Games (pub.1922?) Internet Archive by T.H. Nally

1880 births
1948 deaths
Antisemitism in Ireland
Cumann na nGaedheal TDs
Early Sinn Féin TDs
Irish anti-communists
Irish fascists
Members of the 1st Dáil
Members of the 2nd Dáil
Members of the 3rd Dáil
Members of the 4th Dáil
Members of the 5th Dáil
Members of the Parliament of the United Kingdom for Cork City
People of the Irish Civil War (Pro-Treaty side)
Politicians from County Cork
Prisoners sentenced to death by the British military
UK MPs 1918–1922